The 20813 / 20814 Puri–Jodhpur Express is an Express train belonging to Indian Railways – East Coast Railway zone that runs between  and  in India.

It operates as train number 20813 from Puri to Jodhpur Junction and as train number 20814 in the reverse direction, serving the states of Odisha, Chhattisgarh, Maharashtra, Madhya Pradesh, Rajasthan.

Coaches

The 20813/20814 Puri–Jodhpur Express presently has 1 AC 1st Class, 1 AC 2 tier, 5 AC 3 tier, 9 Sleeper class, 4 Second class seating & 2 SLR (Seating cum Luggage Rake) coaches. In addition, it has a pantry car.

As with most train services in India, coach composition may be amended at the discretion of Indian Railways depending on demand.

Service

The 20813/20814 Puri–Jodhpur Express covers the distance of 2435 kilometres in 44 hours as 20813 Puri–Jodhpur Express (55 km/hr) & in 44 hrs as 20814 Jodhpur–Puri Express (55 km/hr).

Routing

The 20813/20814 Puri–Jodhpur Express runs from Puri via Khurda Road Jn., Sambalpur Jn., Itarsi Junction,  to Jodhpur Junction.

Traction

A Itarsi-based WAP-4 / WAP-7 locomotive hauls the train from Puri until  after which Bhagat Ki Kothi-based WDP-4 / WDP-4B / WDP-4D locomotive for the remainder of the journey until Jodhpur.

Timings

 20813 Puri–Jodhpur Express leaves Puri every Wednesday at 16:00 hrs IST and reaches Jodhpur at 12:00 hrs IST on every Friday.
 20814 Jodhpur–Puri Express leaves Jodhpur every Saturday at 14:00 hrs IST and reaches Puri at 10:00 hrs IST on every Monday.

Coach composition

The train has standard ICF rakes with max speed of 110 kmph.

 1 AC I Tier 
 1 AC II Tier
 3 AC III Tier
 9 Sleeper coaches
 4 General
 2 Second-class Luggage/parcel van

Reversals

 NGP/
 SBP/
 SWM/
 NAD/

External links

References 

Express trains in India
Rail transport in Odisha
Rail transport in Chhattisgarh
Rail transport in Maharashtra
Rail transport in Madhya Pradesh
Rail transport in Rajasthan
Transport in Jodhpur
Transport in Puri